Lawrence Bohun (born between 1575 and 1585, died 19 March 1621) was an English physician and member of the Virginia Governor's Council. His surname is occasionally spelled "Bohune" or "Boone" and he is known for experimenting with some of Virginia's indigenous plants and minerals. He is sometimes credited with being the first experimental scientist in Jamestown and one of its first physicians.

Not much is known about Bohun's early life, but it is estimated that he was born in England between 1575 and 1585 and that he received his education at the University of Leyden in the Netherlands. Bohun had a reputation for being an excellent physician and was hired to perform as the personal physician for Thomas West, Twelfth Baron De La Warr, who was the first governor of Virginia appointed by the Virginia Company of London. He arrived in Virginia on 10 June 1610, which enabled him to help with colonists that had survived the Starving Time of that prior winter. While living in Virginia Bohun also worked on creating wine.

When De La Warr left Virginia the following year in order to recuperate from a bout of scurvy, Bohun accompanied him on the trip. They eventually ended in England, where Bohun practiced medicine and married Alice Barnes. During this time Bohun was active with the Virginia Company, as he was listed as a sharecropper in their third charter and was approved for two grants for Virginia land. Bohun was interested in seeing if silkworms could be cultivated in Virginia, which was evidently unsuccessful as records from the Virginia Company stated that he had a project (presumably the silkworms) that "promised much benefitt but in the end came to nothinge."

Bohun was appointed the physician general of the Virginia colony in 1620 and was also appointed to the Governor's Council, but he would never make it to Virginia to carry out his responsibilities. In 1621, while stopping in the West Indies for supplies, Bohun's ship was attacked by Spanish warships and he was one of several people that died on 19 March 1621.

References

1621 deaths
17th-century English medical doctors
Virginia Governor's Council members
Year of birth uncertain